Lael Neale is an American indie rock musician from Virginia. Neale is currently signed to Sub Pop Records. Neale has released two albums. Her first, I'll Be Your Man, was released in 2015 on Liberal Arts. Neale's second record, Acquainted With Night, was released in 2021 on Sub Pop. In 2022, Neale released her latest song titled "Hotline". It was named one of "The Best New Songs" by Paste Magazine.

Personal life
Neale was born on a farm in rural Virginia.

Discography
Studio albums
I'll Be Your Man (2015)
Acquainted With Night (2021)
Star Eater’s Delight (2023)

References

Musicians from Virginia
Sub Pop artists

Living people
Year of birth missing (living people)